Kathleen Ann Shea (born October 9, 1959) is an American actress, film director, and acting teacher. She is best known for directing the erotic thriller Poison Ivy, which was nominated for the 1992 Sundance Grand Jury Prize.

Early life
Shea was born in Detroit, Michigan to an artist father and nurse mother. She studied teaching at the University of Michigan from which she graduated with honors. After graduating, she spent six months teaching blind children, before taking off at age 19 to Hollywood, California where she started her early modeling career and for a short time attended University of California, Los Angeles.

"I was directing plays I'd written in my back yard when I was twelve", she said later. "I was a total misfit and didn't have any friends, so that's what I did instead. I recruited younger kids from the neighborhood, and their parents paid me to put them in my productions. I made some pretty good money, actually. Helped put me through college. Yay for being a misfit! Yay for not having friends!"

Actor
Shea worked as an actor and model for a number of years, including appearing in a small role in Scarface and Psycho III.

"I was never comfortable being an actress", she said in a 1992 interview. "It was the most ridiculous thing; I am like the antithesis of that. I really, truly am very shy. ... I did it for seven years, and I can't believe I lived through that."

Writer and director
In 1986, she was on location in the Philippines when she struck up a friendship with Andy Ruben. The two of them started writing scripts together, and succeeded in getting The Patriot (1986) made for Roger Corman. Corman agreed to finance another Ruben-Shea script with Shea directing, Stripped to Kill. The resulting movie was successful and launched her directorial career.

Shea made a number of films for Corman based on scripts by herself and Ruben. Corman later described her as a ""talented director. She's particularly good with actors, having been an actress herself. She's taught herself about the camera and has gotten better with each picture."

In a 1990 review of Streets, the Los Angeles Times said Shea "continues to show that she is a first-rate talent, as terrific at handling hard action with style and dispatch as a drawing the best from her casts."

According to Corman, the films she made for him cost less than $500,000 on average and made between $5–10 million. She was then hired by New Line to make Poison Ivy which was a critical and popular hit.

In 1992 her films were honoured with a four-day retrospective at the Museum of Modern Art including the New York premiere of Poison Ivy. According to Larry Karidish, a curator of film at the museum:
Katt's work is distinctive for its style, rhythm, the progression of its narrative. Her movies touch something deep in the psyche. They have a consistent and coherent sensibility and I thought it would make sense to show her work as a body.
 
She now works as an acting teacher, where her past clients have included Christina Applegate, Alison Lohman, Sophia Lillis, and Drew Barrymore.

Personal life
Katt Shea married collaborator Andy Ruben. They divorced in 1992 after 13 years of marriage.

Select credits
The Asphalt Cowboy (1980) – actor
My Tutor (1983) – actor
Scarface (1983) – actor
Preppies (1984) – actor
R.S.V.P. (1984) (TV movie) – actor
Hollywood Hot Tubs (1984) – actor
Barbarian Queen (1985) – actor
Psycho III (1986) – Patsy Boyle
The Devastator (1986) – actor, 2nd unit photography
The Patriot (1986) – writer
Stripped to Kill (1987) – writer, director
Dance of the Damned (1989) – director, writer
Stripped to Kill II: Live Girls (1989) – director, writer
Streets (1990) – director, writer
Poison Ivy (1992) – director, writer
Dance with Death (1992) – story
Joe Bob's Drive-In Theater (1994) (TV series) – director
Last Exit to Earth (1996) – director, actor, writer
The Rage: Carrie 2 (1999) – director, actor
Sharing the Secret (2000) (TV movie) – director
Sanctuary (2001) (TV movie) – director, writer
Nancy Drew and the Hidden Staircase (2019) – director
Rescued by Ruby (2022) – director

Unmade projects
Prince Ombra (c 1993) from novel by Roderick MacLeish for producer Sydney Pollack
Dance of the Damned (c. 2011) – proposed remake of her earlier film
The Tutor – adapted from the novel by Peter Abrahams
The List – a teen drama based on her own script
Hystere, Imps of Perversity – horror anthology TV series developed with Mary Lambert

References

External links

Personal website
Katt Shea at Trailers from Hell

1957 births
Living people
American film actresses
University of Michigan alumni
University of California, Los Angeles alumni
Actresses from Detroit
Film directors from Michigan
21st-century American women